Cyril VII (1775–1872) was Ecumenical Patriarch of Constantinople from 1855 to 1860.

Prior to taking the office of the Patriarchate, he had been Metropolitan of Ainos (since May 1831) and of Amaseia (since March 1847). On September 24, 1855, he ascended the Ecumenical throne. 

He was not a well-educated or an energetic person. Nonetheless, he did much for His Church and people. He did his best to raise funds for the victims of an earthquake in the diocese of Prusa. He issued instructions in the sphere of marriage and family life. 

But he had a lot of enemies who wanted to dethrone him. So, he eventually resigned as Patriarch and spent the rest of his life in prayer and solitude in Halki. 

19th-century Greek people
19th-century Ecumenical Patriarchs of Constantinople
1775 births
1872 deaths